Wonders of China was a Circle-Vision 360° film featured in the China Pavilion at Epcot at the Walt Disney World Resort. The film showcased famous Chinese landmarks and the people, environment, and culture of China. Wonders of China was first shown on October 1, 1982, and closed on March 25, 2003. It was replaced by an updated film, Reflections of China, which opened on May 23, 2003.

Wonders of China also played in the World Premiere Circle-Vision theater in Tomorrowland at Disneyland from 1984 through 1996.

Keye Luke provided the voice-over narration as the philosopher Li Bai while a Chinese actor, Shih Kuan, did the live action footage.

References

External links

Former Walt Disney Parks and Resorts attractions
Tomorrowland
Epcot
Disneyland
Documentary films about China
1982 establishments in Florida
2003 disestablishments in Florida
1984 establishments in California
1996 disestablishments in California